Athletes from the Socialist Federal Republic of Yugoslavia competed at the 1976 Summer Olympics in Montreal, Quebec,  Canada. 88 competitors, 83 men and 5 women, took part in 52 events in 14 sports.

On 26 July a Croatian nationalist ran onto the field of play during the men's handball match between Yugoslavia and West Germany and burned the Yugoslav flag.

Medalists

Archery

In the first time the nation competed in Olympic archery, Yugoslavia entered one man.  He came in ninth place, missing a top eight finish by only one point.

Men's Individual Competition:
 Bojan Postruznik – 2421 points (→ 9th place)

Athletics

Men's 400 metres
 Josip Alebić
 Heat — 46.94 (→ did not advance)

Men's 800 metres
 Luciano Sušanj
 Heat — 1:47.82
 Semi Final — 1:47.03
 Final — 1:45.75 (→ 6th place)

 Milovan Savić
 Heat — 1:47.73 (→ did not advance)

Men's 10.000 metres
 Dušan Janićijević
 Heat — 28:48.87 (→ did not advance)

Men's High Jump
 Danial Temim
 Qualification — 2.10m (→ did not advance)

Men's Long Jump 
 Nenad Stekić
 Qualification — 7.82m
 Final — 7.89m (→ 6th place)

Men's 20 km Race Walk
 Vinko Galušić — 1:34:46 (→ 24th place)

Basketball

Men's Team Competition
Preliminary Round
 Yugoslavia – Puerto Rico 84:63 (38:29)
 Yugoslavia – Czechoslovakia 99:81 (51:43)
 Yugoslavia – United States 93:112 (55:51)
 Yugoslavia – Italy 88:87 (41:57)
 Yugoslavia – Egypt 20:0 b.b.
Semifinals
 Yugoslavia – Soviet Union 89:84 (42:42)
Final
 Yugoslavia – United States 74:95 (38:50) →  Silver Medal

Team Roster
 Blagoja Georgievski
 Dragan Kićanović
 Vinko Jelovac
 Rajko Žižić
 Željko Jerkov
 Andro Knego
 Zoran Slavnić
 Krešimir Ćosić
 Damir Šolman
 Žarko Varajić
 Dražen Dalipagić
 Mirza Delibašić

Boxing

Lightweight (– 60 kg)
Ace Rusevski →  Bronze Medal
First round
Defeated Gerard Hamill (IRL) 4-1
Second round
Defeated Roberto Andino (PUR) RSC-3
Third round
Defeated Reinaldo Valiente (CUB) 5-0
Quarterfinals
Defeated Yves Jeudy (HAI) RSC-2
Semifinals
Lost to Howard Davis (USA) 0-5

Canoeing

Cycling

Two cyclists represented Yugoslavia in 1976.

Sprint
 Vlado Fumić — 21st place

1000m time trial
 Vlado Fumić — 1:13.037 (→ 24th place)

Individual pursuit
 Bojan Ropret — 22nd place

Handball

Judo

Rowing

Sailing

Shooting

Swimming

Water polo

Men's Team Competition
Team Roster
Boško Lozica
Damir Polić
Dejan Dabović
Đuro Savinović
Dušan Antunović
Miloš Marković
Ozren Bonačić
Predrag Manojlović
Siniša Belamarić
Uroš Marović
Zoran Kačić

Wrestling

References

External links
Official Olympic Reports
International Olympic Committee results database

Nations at the 1976 Summer Olympics
1976
Summer Olympics